The Miss Arizona competition is the pageant that selects the representative for the state of Arizona in the Miss America pageant. Arizona has twice won the Miss America title. The first Miss Arizona, Anna Marie Barnett, was crowned in 1938.

Melody Pierce of Phoenix was crowned Miss Arizona 2022 on June 25, 2022 at the Madison Center of the Arts in Phoenix, Arizona. She competed for the title of Miss America 2023 at the Mohegan Sun in Uncasville, Connecticut in December 2022 where she was a Women Who Brand Finalist.

Gallery of past titleholders

Results summary
The following is a visual summary of the past results of Miss Arizona titleholders at the national Miss America pageants/competitions. The year in parentheses indicates the year of the national competition during which a placement and/or award was garnered, not the year attached to the contestant's state title.

Placements
 Miss Americas: Jacque Mercer (1949), Vonda Kay Van Dyke (1965)
 3rd runners-up: Barbara Hilgenberg (1957) (tie), Stacey Momeyer (1998), Jennifer Sedler (2012)
 4th runners-up: Patricia Allebrand (1960), Susan Bergstrom (1964), Stacey Peterson (1976)
 Top 10: Beth Andre (1956), Lynn Freyse (1958), Pam Wenzel (1980), Debra Daniels (1983), Kathryn Bulkley (2011)
 Top 15: Anna Marie Barnett (1938), Wanda Law (1947), Laura Lawless (2003)

Awards

Preliminary Awards
 Preliminary Lifestyle & Fitness: Jacque Mercer (1949), Lynn Freyse (1958)
 Preliminary Talent: Jacque Mercer (1949), Pam Wenzel (1980)

Non-finalist Awards
 Non-finalist Talent: Paula Lou Welch (1963), Linda Gail Sirrine (1973), Sarah Tattersall (1982), Lisa Mandel (1989), Tammy Kettunen (1990), Kimberly Hoskins (1991), Stacy Agren (1995), Erin Gingrich (1997), Erin Nurss (2009), Amber Barto (2021)

Other awards
 Miss Congeniality: Vonda Kay Van Dyke (1965)
 Quality of Life Award Winners: Amanda Murray (1994), Stacy Agren (1995)
 Quality of Life Award 1st runners-up: Hilary Griffith (2007)
 Quality of Life Award Finalists: Audrey Sibley (2006)
 Special Scholarship: Donna Riggs (1959)
 Women in Business Scholarship Award Finalists: Jacqueline Thomas (2020)
 Women Who Brand Finalists: Melody Pierce (2023)

Winners

External links
 Official website

References

Arizona culture
Arizona
Women in Arizona
Recurring events established in 1938
1938 establishments in Arizona
Annual events in Arizona
Chandler, Arizona
Events in Maricopa County, Arizona